George Burton (17 September 1898 in Butte, Montana – 8 December 1955 in Los Angeles, California) was an American silent film actor.

Filmography
 Bill and Coo (1948) .... George Burton, in prologue
 Men Without Souls (1940) (uncredited) .... Guard
 Dick Tracy's G-Men (1939) (uncredited)
 When Tomorrow Comes (1939) (uncredited) .... Bus Boy
 Union Pacific (1939) (uncredited) .... Laborer
 The Lone Ranger Rides Again (1939) (uncredited) .... Ed Powers
 Wells Fargo (1937) (uncredited) .... Bit
 Double or Nothing (1937) (uncredited) .... Ticket Taker
 Come on, Cowboys (1937) .... Sheriff
 You Only Live Once (1937) (uncredited) .... Convict waiter
 The Mysterious Avenger (1936) (uncredited) .... Texas Ranger
 Coronado (1935)
 Here Comes Cookie (1935) (uncredited) .... Iceman
 Tumbling Tumbleweeds (1935) (uncredited) .... Sheriff Manley
 The Miracle Rider (1935) .... Mort, Janss Hand
 Ruggles of Red Gap (1935) (uncredited) .... Doc Squires
 Law Beyond the Range (1935) (uncredited) .... Ranger Tex Boyle
 In Old Santa Fe (1934) .... Henchman Red
 Smoke Lightning (1933) (uncredited) .... Jordan
 The Rainbow Trail (1932) (uncredited) .... Elliott
 The Painted Desert (1931) (uncredited) .... Santa Fe
 Buying a Gun (1929)
 Blake of Scotland Yard (1927) (uncredited) .... Henchman
 Jail Birdies (1927)
 Shell Socked (1926)
 Wild West (1925) .... Dan Norton
 Idaho (1925)
 Getting Gertie's Goat (1924)
 Busy Buddies (1924)
 Black and Blue (1923)
 Jiggs in Society (1920)
 The Little Boy Scout (1917) .... Luis Alvarez

External links

American male film actors
Male actors from Butte, Montana
American male silent film actors
1898 births
1955 deaths
Male actors from Montana
20th-century American male actors